Michael A. "Mike" Brown (born April 18, 1950) is a former politician in Ontario, Canada and was the Speaker of the Legislative Assembly of Ontario from October 2005 until October 2007. He sat in the Ontario legislature representing the northern riding of Algoma—Manitoulin for the Ontario Liberal Party from 1987 to 2011.

Background
Brown was educated at the University of Western Ontario and Humber College, and worked as a funeral director before entering public life. He is a former member of the Manitoulin Planning Board, and is a past president of the Manitoulin Island Country Club.

Politics
Brown was elected to the Ontario legislature in the provincial election of 1987, defeating New Democrat Ron Boucher and Progressive Conservative Ben Wilson.  The Algoma—Manitoulin riding had been held by the Progressive Conservatives for several years, and Brown's victory was part of a larger trend towards the Liberal Party in northern Ontario.

The Liberals were defeated by the NDP in the provincial election of 1990. Most ridings in northern Ontario were won by the NDP, and Brown was only able to defeat NDP candidate Lois Miller by 207 votes.  He was re-elected by a larger margin in the provincial election of 1995, which was won by the Progressive Conservatives. In 1996, he endorsed Dwight Duncan's bid to lead the Ontario Liberal Party.

In 1996, the Tory government of Mike Harris introduced a measure to reduce the number of ridings in the province from 130 to 103.  Brown's constituency of Algoma—Manitoulin was joined with the neighbouring constituency of Algoma to create a much larger riding bearing the Algoma—Manitoulin name.  He faced New Democrat Lynn Watson and Progressive Conservative Keith Currie in the election of 1999. Although Currie actually received a plurality of votes in the old Algoma riding, Brown's dominance over the eastern corner of the constituency was such that he was able to win re-election without difficulty.  The Tories again won the election; Brown served as Deputy Speaker from 2000 to 2001.

The Liberals won a majority government in the provincial election of 2003, although Brown was actually re-elected with a reduced majority over New Democrat Peter Denley.  On October 23, 2003, he was named parliamentary assistant to David Ramsay, the Ontario Minister of Natural Resources.  He was elected speaker of the 38th Legislative Assembly of Ontario on October 11, 2005, defeating Tory Ted Arnott in a two-way contest. The vacancy in the position was caused when Alvin Curling was named ambassador to the Dominican Republic.

Brown stood for re-election as Speaker when the 39th Legislative Assembly first convened following the 2007 provincial election but he was defeated by fellow Liberal Steve Peters on the fourth ballot. Brown's loss was attributed to the perception that he favoured the ruling party when meting discipline to unruly politicians.

In the 2011 provincial election he lost to NDP candidate Michael Mantha by nearly 4,000 votes.

Electoral record

References

External links

1950 births
Canadian funeral directors
Humber College alumni
Living people
Ontario Liberal Party MPPs
People from Manitoulin Island
People from Sarnia
Speakers of the Legislative Assembly of Ontario
University of Western Ontario alumni
21st-century Canadian politicians